Silvestre Vargas (31 December, 1901 – October 7, 1985, Guadalajara) was a Mexican mariachi musician. In 1928, he became the leader of Mariachi Vargas de Tecalitlán, an ensemble from Jalisco begun by his father in 1898. In the 1930s the group moved to Mexico City, and Vargas, along with Rubén Fuentes, became pivotal composers in the evolution of the genre. Silvestre and the Mariachi Vargas made dozens of recordings and starred in many films through the 1960s. He died in 1985, and his gravesite became a popular site for pilgrimages on the date of his death. In 1997, a museum dedicated to Silvestre was established in Jalisco.

References

1901 births
1985 deaths
Mariachi musicians
Mexican fiddlers
Mexican musicians
20th-century violinists